Fate/unlimited codes is a fighting game planned by Cavia, developed by Eighting, and published by Capcom. It was released in Japan for arcades on June 11, 2008, and for the PlayStation 2 on December 18, 2008. An enhanced port was released for the PlayStation Portable in Japan on June 18, 2009, and was subsequently released digitally on the PlayStation Store in North America and Europe on September 3 and 10, 2009, respectively. 
 
Based on the visual novel Fate/stay night, the player is given option of playing as each of their character during battles. The idea of having a fighting game since 2003 but faced multiple issues until its release in 2008. Kinoko Nasu and other staff members from the visual novel worked alongside the developers to retell its events in the form of fights as seen between mages known as Masters and spirits known as Servants. This game also marks the first appearance of the Servant Saber Lily based on a design from Saber used in the visual novel during its Unlimited Blade Works storyline. The soundtrack of the game was performed by Basiscape.

The game was received with positive sales in Japan and obtained generally positive critical response in Western regions, earning a 72 out of 100 in Metacritic. Reviewers praised the balanced gameplay mechanic but criticized its presentation as it might confused newcomers from the franchise. The game was often compared with the game Soulcalibur: Broken Destiny based on multiple aspects.

Gameplay

As in other games of the genre, the game process of Fate/unlimited codes is built on a battle between two characters, using combinations of strikes to lower an opponent's health points to zero. A player conducts a series of battles up to two or three (depending on the value set by the player) one-on-one victories with computer opponents or with another player. The timing of individual rounds may be limited or unlimited, depending on the player's settings. Depending on the combinations used and the damage inflicted with their help during the round, points are used that are used to statistically calculate the success of the game in certain modes.

The game is a three-dimensional fighting game based on the use of the width and height of the playing field with the possibility of moving into the arena only for evading attack. Manage character attacks by using a customizable three-button gamepad system; the fourth button is used to cancel your own started combinations and block enemy attacks. When using attack buttons, two types of energy scales are accumulated - magic energy and the energy of the Holy Grail. The scale of magical energy is divided into three cells, allowing you to enhance and supplement the standard types of attacks (English Magic Burst). The cells are filled individually for each player, after applying the energy reserve must be replenished. The accumulation of the energy of the Holy Grail occurs simultaneously for both opponents and opens up the possibility of using "super receptions", which consumes magical energy. The strength and type of super-reception varies depending on the amount of magical energy expended to activate it. Some of the characters (Kotomine, Bazett and Rin) also have a limited and unrecoverable number of special items needed to conduct unique remote attacks. There are four levels of difficulty that can be adjusted between matches.

Characters

 Saber
 Shirou Emiya
 Archer
 Rin Tohsaka
 Lancer
 Rider
 Berserker
 Assassin
 Gilgamesh
 Caster
 Kirei Kotomine
 Sakura Matou
 Luviagelita Edelfelt
PS2 and PSP exclusive characters
 Bazett Fraga Mcremitz
 Saber Alter
 Leysritt
 Zero Lancer

Production
The idea of developing a fighting game genre based on the setting and characters of Fate/stay night belonged to Type-Moon co-founder and illustrator Takashi Takeuchi. During the last preparations for the release of a visual novel in late 2003, he was with screenwriter Kinoko Nasu was fond of the fighting game Gotcha Force. Capcom's production and, under the impression of the gameplay of this game, decided to take up the idea of translating the basic principles of Fate/stay night into the form of confrontation between two opponents behind a game console. In 2007, Type-Moon together with the company Cavia Russian under the auspices of Capcom, a comedy fighting game in the Tibi-style Fate/tiger colosseum  was released. Then these companies started planning a new game scenario of the same genre for the Namco System 246 gaming machines, followed by porting to the PlayStation 2, which received Fate/unlimited codes name. On the publisher's side, Kazuhiro Tsuchiya was appointed producer by Type-Moon, and Takeuchi personally supervised the project. However, at the stage of primary game design in the summer of 2007, Cavia, due to financial difficulties, was forced to cut staff and temporarily suspend the development of all new projects, including Fate/unlimited codes.

With the mediation of Tsutsii in the same year, all materials of the future game were transferred to Eighting. Yuki Tagava became the lead programmer for the project, Nobuyuki Irie became the designer of 3D models, and Naoto Naruse was approved as the head of the developer. The basis of the gameplay was based on the abilities of the characters of the original visual novel - the so-called “noble fantasies” (Jpn. 宝), which are the unique skills of the “servant” characters activated by magical energy. For the rest of the characters who did not possess “noble phantasms”, these blows were invented taking into account the specifics of each character formulated in the original sources. The upper limit of damage for all super moves to create a game balance was set to be the same for all characters and amounted to 7000 health points, despite the fact that in Fate/stay night such blows had different power. The simulated locations of the visual novel were used as arenas for battles. Each character's storyline script was written by Kinoko Nasu, although Takeuchi later admitted that due to numerous simplifications regarding the original source, these stories may be considered inferior among fans of the Fate universe.

Ryuuji Higurashi, who previously spoke in the same position when creating the Gotcha Force, was invited to play the role of a graphic character designer. Higugrasi, along with Takeuchi and Type-Moon employees, completed all the graphic materials of the future game, in strict accordance with the stylistic features of the Fate/stay night design. Saber Lily's character was originally created by Takashi Takeuchi, as an alternative costume for Saber, based on the visual novel's Unlimited Blade Works story arcade dress, and got its name because of the similarity of color and shape of the dress to the white lily. After the release of the game on the arcade machines, Saber Lily received a lot of positive feedback from fans and, unlike the game costumes of other characters, when porting the game to the PlayStation 2, she had her own name displayed in the match interface. Originally it was planned to include the character only in a limited edition of the game, but later it was added to the standard version. On May 30, 2012, it was reported that due to an expiring digital license, Capcom USA was discontinuing the game for sale on the PlayStation Store in that region as of June 12 of that year.

The soundtrack of the game was performed by Basiscape, who created new background music compositions, and also arranged the original tracks of the visual novel Fate / stay night. The opening song is "code" by singer Sachi Tainaka, which was later released as a single.

Reception

The PlayStation Portable port of the game sold 34,000 units in Japan during its release week, behind Tomodachi Collection. Critical reception to the game has been positive, reaching a 72 out of 100 in Metacritic.

The graphic component of the game was perceived with separate complaints. In particular, Evgeny Zakirov, a columnist for the Country of the Games magazine, noted the use of a low-poly grid for character modeling, which, according to William van Dyck from MeriStation (Spanish), required player habituation. However, if Zakirov considered this flaw uncritical for the PSP version, then Van Dijk concluded that the graphics of the game are far behind Soulcalibur: Broken Destiny and Dissidia Final Fantasy. Because of this effect, the critic of the Internet portal PS Illustrated Matt Henchy called the faces of the characters simply “curves”. On the positive side, Zakirov and van Dijk outlined the use of cel-shading animation, which allowed, in their words, “to create a correspondence to the spirit of the original source”. Todd Siolek, reviewer of the Internet portal Anime News Network, as a virtue of the game pointed to discreet character design, especially in comparison with the Guilty Gear series. Most critics, in addition to this, emphasized the good detailing of the costumes of each of the characters., as well as the elaboration and diversity of animation and special effects. According to Carolyn Petit from GameSpot, very diverse views were used in  Fate/unlimited codes, which allowed to diversify the overall visual range. Matt Henchy also noted the good quality of the background images used in the cut scenes, but admitted that instead of them, "I would prefer to see a full-fledged animated in-game video."

The main advantage of Fate/unlimited codes observers called the created combat system and various combinations of strikes. According to William van Dyck, although the gameplay of this fighting game did not introduce any innovations from the point of view of the genre, the resulting combosystem turned out to be unique and high-level. Reviewers outlined the ease of learning the basics of the game, as well as the convenience and ease of management, understandable for beginners of the genre. The game was recognized as well-balanced by the strength of individual characters, which was realized due to the difference in speed and predominant type of attacks between strong and weak fighters. Observers have noted that the abilities of each character correspond to his skills in the visual novel and different originality. requiring the player to develop strategies for the use of individual techniques for a particular opponent. Among the game modes, observers mainly singled out “Missions”, which were well suited, in their opinion, for teaching various combat techniques. A large number of in-game achievements have been recognized as contributing to replayability. However, Yevgeny Zakirov considered the mini-games in additional missions completed “not as interesting as in Street Fighter IV.

The use of Japanese dubbing in the localized English version of the game was ambiguously perceived: some observers singled out this fact as an advantage emphasizing the connection with Fate/stay night. Others considered it a flaw, affecting the difficulties of understanding the plot. However, the Japanese voice track was unanimously recognized for its high quality. Opinions differed in assessing the background sound track, which differed from the perception of it as "pleasant". "Diverse" and "complementary gameplay" to "an ordinary mixture of electronic-rock and dj pop" and "non-memorable".

According to the browser Gaming Age, a significant drawback was the lack of notifying players about the autosave mode that was initially turned off, due to which some of the progress in the game could be lost. Western critics also pointed out spelling errors in the localized version, the impossibility of acquiring the game on Universal Media Disc media, reducing the number of hero skills as compared to the PS2 version, as well as the perceived high price of the digital only PlayStation Network release at $29.99.

In general, the game was called a "worthy" and "quality" representative of the genre, although inferior in visual design Soulcalibur: Broken Destiny. Todd Siolek called Fate / unlimited codes "one of the best adaptations of anime to the fighting game genre". In the opinion of William van Dyck and Carolyn Petit, the game was an example of “a good balance between simplicity and depth of gameplay”, and also “knew how to use its own advantages”. Observer Ryan Clements of IGN called Fate/unlimited codes gameplay" more interesting than in Soulcalibur: Broken Destiny". Game Chronicles reviewer recommended the game to both fans of the Fate series and Capcom fighting game fans.

References

External links
 

2008 video games
Arcade video games
Capcom games
Eighting games
Fate/stay night video games
Fighting games used at the Super Battle Opera tournament
Fighting games
Multiplayer and single-player video games
PlayStation 2 games
PlayStation Portable games
RenderWare games
Type-Moon games
Video games based on Arthurian legend
Video games based on classical mythology
Video games developed in Japan
Video games scored by Manabu Namiki
Video games scored by Masaharu Iwata
Video games with 2.5D graphics